Edward "Eddie" Cunningham (born 22 February 1951) is a former professional rugby league footballer who played in the 1960s, 1970s and 1980s.

Background
Eddie Cunningham was born in St. Helens, Lancashire, England.

Playing career

Wigan
Cunningham played  in Wigan's 19–9 victory over Salford in the 1973 Lancashire Cup Final during the 1973–74 season at Wilderspool Stadium, Warrington on Saturday 13 October 1973.

St Helens

Widnes
After spending one season at Leeds, Cunningham was signed by Widnes in August 1980 for a fee of £20,000.

International honours
Eddie Cunningham won caps for Wales while at St. Helens in the 1975 Rugby League World Cup against England, Australia, England, and Australia, in 1977 against England, in 1978 against France, England, and Australia, and won a cap for Great Britain while at St. Helens in 1978 against Australia.

Genealogical information
Eddie Cunningham is the father of St. Helens and Widnes Vikings rugby league footballer Gareth Cunningham, and the brother of rugby league footballers Tommy Cunningham and Keiron Cunningham.

References

External links
Profile at saints.org.uk
Statistics at wigan.rlfans.com
Statistics at rugby.widnes.tv

1951 births
Living people
Batley Bulldogs players
English rugby league players
Great Britain national rugby league team players
Lance Todd Trophy winners
Leeds Rhinos players
Rugby league centres
Rugby league locks
Rugby league players from St Helens, Merseyside
Rugby league second-rows
St Helens R.F.C. players
Wales national rugby league team players
Widnes Vikings players
Wigan Warriors players